Persona...Grata is a 2005 folk music album by Vin Garbutt.

Track listing
 Morning Informs
 Silver and Gold
 Storm Around Tumbledown
 It Couldn’t Be Done
 The Flowers and the Guns
 John Doonan’s Hornpipe/Tinker's Alley Reel
 For an Explanation
 Down by the Dockyard Wall
 Punjabi Girl
 The Loftus Emigrant
 The Kilburn Horse

2005 albums
Vin Garbutt albums